The glomerular basement membrane of the kidney is the basal lamina layer of the glomerulus. The glomerular endothelial cells, the glomerular basement membrane, and the filtration slits between the podocytes perform the filtration function of the glomerulus, separating the blood in the capillaries from the filtrate that forms in Bowman's capsule. The glomerular basement membrane is a fusion of the endothelial cell and podocyte basal laminas, and is the main site of restriction of water flow. Glomerular basement membrane is secreted and maintained by podocyte cells.

Layers
The glomular basement membrane contains three layers:

The glomerular membrane consists of mesangial cells, modified pericytes that in other parts of the body separate capillaries from each other. The podocytes adjoining them have filtration slits of diameter 25 nm that are formed by the pseudopodia arising from them. The filtration slits are covered by a diaphragm that includes the transmembrane protein nephrin.

Pathology

 Goodpasture's syndrome is also known as anti-glomerular basement membrane disease. Capillaries become inflamed as a result of damage to the basement membrane by antibodies to alpha 3 NC1 domain of type IV collagen.
 Nephrotic syndrome is a change in the structure of the glomerular filtration mechanism usually in the glomerular basement membrane. Some symptoms include proteinuria, hypoalbuminaemia, oedema, and hyperlipidemia.
 Diabetic glomerulosclerosis is a thickening of the basement membrane, which can become up to 4-5 times thicker than normal. Can be caused by insulin deficiency or resultant hyperglycemia.
 Alport syndrome is a X-linked hereditary nephritis caused by mutations in type IV collagen, leading to a split lamina densa of the glomerular basement membrane. It also affects the eye and inner ear.

See also
 Agrin, a protein linked to heparan sulfate
 basement membrane
 nephrin

Additional images

References

External links
 
 "The GBM and its disorders" at dmed.ed.ac.uk

Kidney anatomy